San Ramón Airport is an airstrip serving the town of San Ramón in the Beni Department of Bolivia. The runway is adjacent to the east side of the town.

See also

Transport in Bolivia
List of airports in Bolivia

References

External links 
OpenStreetMap - San Ramón
OurAirports - San Ramón
SkyVector - San Ramón
Fallingrain - San Ramón Airport

Airports in Beni Department